Manja is a 2014 Malayalam comedy film written and directed by Bijoy Urmise. This is the first film directed by Binoy Urmise. It stars Niyas Backer in lead role and Shammi Thilakan, Ashokan and Joy Mathew in supporting roles.

Plot 
The film revolves around the central character Jackson (Niyas Bakker), who is a hard working, simple young guy from a village. His greatest desire is to become a film star. His journey to achieve the goal in life and some interesting incidents is the main plot of the film.

Cast 
 Niyas Backer as Jackson
 Shammi Thilakan as Abhayaraj
 Ashokan as Prasad
 Joy Mathew as narrator
 Kulapulli Leela as Jackson's mother
 Balachandran Chullikad as Abhayaraj's friend
 Ramesh Pisharody
 Vijesh Vijay

Soundtrack

The film features songs composed by Sejo John and Jessin Georgeh and written by Santhosh Varma(Urulunnu Shakadam) and Bijoy Urmise.

References

External links
 Manja at oneindia.in
 Manja at indiaglitz

2010s Malayalam-language films
2014 films